Justinus Jacob Leonard van der Brugghen (6 August 1804, in Nijmegen – 2 October 1863, in Ubbergen) was a Dutch politician.

References
 Mr. J.J.L. van der Brugghen at Parlement & Politiek (Dutch)

1804 births
1863 deaths
19th-century Dutch lawyers
Leiden University alumni
Ministers of Justice of the Netherlands
People from Nijmegen
Prime Ministers of the Netherlands